The Australian women's cricket team toured England between May and August 1963. The test series against England women's cricket team was played for the Women's Ashes, which Australia were defending. England won the series 1–0, winning the third test, therefore regaining the Ashes.

Squads

Tour Matches

1-day single innings matches

2-day matches

Test Series

1st Test

2nd Test

3rd Test

References

External links
Australia Women tour of England 1963 from Cricinfo

The Women's Ashes
Women's cricket tours of England
Australia women's national cricket team tours